Wyckoff Heights Medical Center is a 350-bed teaching hospital located in the Wyckoff Heights section of Bushwick, Brooklyn in New York City. The hospital is an academic affiliate of the NewYork-Presbyterian's Weill Cornell Medical College of Cornell University, the New York Medical College and New York Institute of Technology College of Osteopathic Medicine. The primary goal of the center is to train future physicians that are qualified medically and personably.

History
In 1887 the German Hospital Society of Brooklyn was organized by the Plattdeutscher Volksfest-Verein for the purpose of raising funds, purchasing land, and constructing a hospital to serve the large German immigrant community in Brooklyn.

The hospital opened its doors in 1899 as the German Hospital of Brooklyn, but was renamed Wyckoff Heights Hospital after World War I because of anti-German sentiments and eventually renamed Wyckoff Heights Medical Center.

During the 1990s, Wyckoff was managed by Preferred Health Network.

Designations and achievements
Wyckoff Heights Medical Center is a New York State designated stroke center and level III perinatal center.

The American Heart Association and the American Stroke Association awarded the hospital with a "Silver Performance Achievement Award" in 2011 and a "Gold Plus Performance Achievement Award" in 2012.

Surgeons at Wyckoff Medical Center were the first in the state and surrounding Tri-state area to perform an artificial disc implant into a spine.

In 2006 Wyckoff Heights Medical Center received top honors from HSS Incorporated (a medical coding software developer) for the hospital's medical coding practices, as part of the third-annual Top 200 Coding Hospital Report.

Community programs
Asthmapolis

Wyckoff Heights Medical Center is the first New York area hospital to use Asthmapolis. Marketed as the BreathEasy program, the hospital provides participants with the smartphone application and a snap-on sensor that tracks how often participants use their asthma inhaler. Wyckoff physicians receive immediate notification of a patients worsening condition.  The program is offered through the hospital's pediatric department.

Patient safety ratings
In 2012, Consumer Reports ranked Wyckoff Heights Medical Center worse than average in the NYC area in patient safety.

References

NewYork–Presbyterian Healthcare System
Hospitals in Brooklyn
Bushwick, Brooklyn
Hospitals established in 1889
1889 establishments in New York (state)
Teaching hospitals in New York City